Laoukobong (also Laoukobang) is a village in the commune of Martap, in the Adamawa Region of Cameroon.

Population 
In 1967, Laoukobong comptait 412 inhabitants, mainly Fula people

At the time of the 2005 census, there were 898 people in the village.

References

Bibliography
 Jean Boutrais (ed.), Peuples et cultures de l'Adamaoua (Cameroun) : actes du colloque de Ngaoundéré, du 14 au 16 janvier 1992, ORSTOM, Paris ; Ngaoundéré-Anthropos, 1993, 316 p. 
 Dictionnaire des villages de l'Adamaoua, ONAREST, Yaoundé, October 1974, 133 p.

External links
 Martap, on the website Communes et villes unies du Cameroun (CVUC)

Populated places in Adamawa Region